Sean Michael O'Driscoll (born 1 July 1957) is a former professional footballer and manager. He has previously managed AFC Bournemouth, Doncaster Rovers, Crawley Town, Nottingham Forest, Bristol City and Walsall. He was known by the nickname "Noisy" in his playing days at Fulham. He represented the Republic of Ireland as a player.

Playing career
As a player, O'Driscoll was a midfielder for Fulham (1979–84) and AFC Bournemouth (1984–95). He also won three caps for the Republic of Ireland. He played as Bournemouth won the inaugural Associate Members' Cup by beating Hull City in the final. When he retired in 1995, he had played a club-record 423 league games for Bournemouth (his record has since been broken by Neil Young and Steve Fletcher), and subsequently joined the club's coaching staff.

Management career

AFC Bournemouth
In August 2000, he was appointed manager at Bournemouth, and despite limited financial resources, achieved good results, including promotion via the Third Division play-offs in the 2002–03 season.

Doncaster Rovers
O'Driscoll left Bournemouth in September 2006 to become manager of Doncaster Rovers during the season the club moved from Belle Vue to Keepmoat. Notable events early in his career with Doncaster include a 4–0 victory away at Brentford, winning the manager of the month award for January 2007, and also overseeing Rovers' 3–2 success over Bristol Rovers in the Football League Trophy final in 2007. This success meant that O'Driscoll had achieved the rare feat of managing two different teams to victory at the Millennium Stadium.

In O'Driscoll's first full season in charge, 2007–08, he steered Doncaster to promotion into the Championship after a 1–0 victory over Leeds United in the League One play-off final at Wembley Stadium. The following season, 2008–09, saw his side meet his demands of not being relegated back down again. They ended up 14th, comfortably clear of relegation.

For the following season and a half, O'Driscoll turned Doncaster into a comfortable mid-table team on one of the tightest budgets in the Championship. However, a plethora of injuries in the second half of the 2010–11 season (which at one point even saw the club request to postpone a match with Norwich City because they were struggling to field a first 11.) saw Doncaster go on a dreadful run of form winning just one of their final 19 matches of the season, though they still survived due to their good form over the first half of the season.

O'Driscoll could not inspire a comeback during the start of the following season and on 23 September 2011 with Doncaster taking just a single point from their first seven games, it was confirmed that O'Driscoll, along with his assistant Richard O'Kelly, had been relieved of their duties by Doncaster Rovers.

He became Nottingham Forest coach under Steve Cotterill in the 2011-2012 Championship season. He left the club to join Crawley as manager in the summer of 2012.

Crawley Town
O'Driscoll was appointed Crawley Town manager in May 2012. In July 2012 he left the club without managing a competitive game to take over at Nottingham Forest

Nottingham Forest
On 19 July 2012 O'Driscoll was appointed as manager of Nottingham Forest by the club's owners, the Al Hasawi family. By 31 August 2012 he had signed 11 new players, including fan favourite Adlène Guedioura. He also linked up once again with former Doncaster players Simon Gillett, James Coppinger and Billy Sharp.

After just five months in charge of the club, just hours after a 4–2 victory over Leeds United, O'Driscoll was sacked on 26 December 2012. He has left Nottingham Forest twice in one year after previously being the club's coach during the 2011–2012 season. Forest owner Fawaz Al-Hasawi had received advice from the Hull City  board that a manager with Premier League experience was needed to secure promotion, which lead Al-Hasawi to make the decision. He originally planned to sack O'Driscoll on Christmas Day, but Forest Chief Executive Mark Arthur refused to follow the order until the following day.

Bristol City
O'Driscoll was announced as Bristol City manager on a 12-month rolling contract on 14 January 2013. The club were bottom of the Football League Championship at the time of his appointment. O'Driscoll's first match in charge of Bristol City came on 19 January 2013, a 1–0 defeat against Leeds United at Elland Road. He earned his first win as Bristol City manager on 26 January 2013, a 2–1 victory against Ipswich Town at Ashton Gate. This sparked an initial upturn in City's fortunes, with 5 wins and 2 draws from their next 10 games taking them on the verge of climbing out of the relegation zone. However the form was not sustained, with 7 defeats, 2 draws and no wins from their last 9 games seeing City relegated to League One with 3 games to spare and finishing bottom of the table.

The start of the 2013 season saw the club at the bottom of the division with 6 points from 6 draws, no wins and 5 losses. Bristol City parted company with O'Driscoll on 28 November.

England U19s
On 3 September 2014 the FA announced that Sean O'Driscoll would replace the outgoing Noel Blake in the post of England U19 manager.
On 6 July 2015 it was confirmed that Sean had negotiated his release from this role in order to take over as assistant manager at Liverpool F.C

Liverpool (assistant)
On 6 July 2015 it was announced by Liverpool that Sean O'Driscoll had been appointed assistant manager, replacing Colin Pascoe for the 2015–16 Premier League season. Upon being appointed, O'Driscoll said he was excited to be joining one of the world's most iconic football clubs.

He left the position in October 2015 after the sacking of Brendan Rodgers.

Walsall
On 18 December 2015, O'Driscoll was announced as head coach of Walsall. O'Driscoll's first match in charge of Walsall ended in a 2–0 victory over Port Vale. On 6 March 2016, O'Driscoll was sacked by Walsall.

Wolves
On 10 July 2017, O'Driscoll was announced as a professional phase coach in Wolves Academy.

Portsmouth
On 22 March 2019, O'Driscoll was appointed as head of coaching and learning for the Portsmouth's academy. O'Driscoll formally resigned from this role on 29 September 2021.

Weymouth
On 14 December 2021, O'Driscoll joined the backroom team at National League side Weymouth on a non-contract basis.

Honours
Individual
League One Manager of the Month: January 2007

See also
 List of Republic of Ireland international footballers born outside the Republic of Ireland

References

External links

Footballers from Wolverhampton
English footballers
Republic of Ireland association footballers
English football managers
Republic of Ireland football managers
English people of Irish descent
Republic of Ireland international footballers
Republic of Ireland under-21 international footballers
Fulham F.C. players
AFC Bournemouth players
AFC Bournemouth managers
Doncaster Rovers F.C. managers
1957 births
Living people
Alvechurch F.C. players
English Football League managers
Crawley Town F.C. managers
Nottingham Forest F.C. managers
Bristol City F.C. managers
Liverpool F.C. non-playing staff
Walsall F.C. managers
Oldham Athletic A.F.C. non-playing staff
Willenhall Town F.C. players
Association football midfielders
Association football coaches